The following is a list of musicians and musical groups from the Canadian province of Ontario.

List of Ontario musicians by genre:

Uncategorized 

Anders - Mississauga
Daniel Caesar - Oshawa
Magic! –   Toronto
Bryan Adams – Kingston
Eva Avila – Ottawa
Barenaked Ladies – Scarborough, Toronto
Jacksoul - Toronto
Justin Bieber – Stratford, ON
Parichay (singer) - Scarborough, Toronto 
Jully Black – Toronto
Blue Rodeo – Toronto
Kevin Spencer - Hamilton
Keshia Chanté – Ottawa
Bruce Cockburn – Ottawa
Deborah Cox – Toronto
Hugh Dillon – Kingston
Saga (band) – Oakville
Drake – Toronto
Wednesday – Oshawa
J. D. Fortune – Mississauga
Sarah Harmer – Burlington
Kardinal Offishall – Scarborough, Toronto
James LaBrie – Penetanguishene
Avril Lavigne – Napanee
Gordon Lightfoot – Orillia
Lights – Timmins
Five Man Electrical Band – Ottawa
Little X – Toronto
Guy Lombardo – London
Brian Melo – Hamilton
Metric – Toronto
Alanis Morissette – Ottawa
Joey Muha - Port Dover
Our Lady Peace – Toronto (Raine Maida attended University of Toronto)
Peaches – Toronto
Protest The Hero – Whitby
Hail The Villain – Oshawa
Anastasia Rizikov – Toronto
Rush – Toronto
Paul Shaffer – Thunder Bay
Silverstein – Burlington
Shawn Mendes - Toronto
Skye Sweetnam – Bolton
Snow – Toronto
The Tragically Hip – Kingston
Shania Twain – Timmins
Vanity – Niagara Falls
Tamia Washington – Windsor
Neil Young – Toronto
Joel Zimmerman (deadmau5) – Niagara Falls, Ontario
Vikas Kohli – Mississauga
Henry Lau – Toronto
Jeon Somi - Woodstock
Platinum Blonde –   Toronto
Honeymoon Suite –   Niagara Falls
The Spoons –   Burlington
Tory Lanez -   Brampton, Ontario
List of best-selling singles in Canada
List of Billboard Hot 100 number-ones by Canadian artists
The Weeknd –   Toronto
Lawrence Gowan - Toronto

Alt-country

 Andrew Cash
 Blackie and the Rodeo Kings
 Charlie Angus and Grievous Angels
 Fred Eaglesmith
 Lost Dakotas
 Ron Sexsmith
 The Sadies

Barbershop
 MegaCity Chorus

Classical
Edwin Orion Brownell
Glenn Gould

Contemporary Christian
 Article One
 Hawk Nelson
 Manafest
 Newworldson
 Thousand Foot Krutch

Country and country rock

 Blue Rodeo
 Cowboy Junkies
 Leah Daniels
 Handsome Ned
 Tim Hicks
 Kansas Stone
 Lost Dakotas
 Shae Dupuy
 Prairie Oyster
 Skydiggers
 Shania Twain

Electronic

 Deadmau5
 DVBBS
 Esthero
 Kids on TV
 Lesbians on Ecstasy
 MSTRKRFT
 Crystal Castles
 Rezz

Ethnic / Multicultural

 AfroNubians
 Bedouin Soundclash
 Beyond the Pale
 Jaffa Road
 Raghav
 Souljazz Orchestra - Ottawa
 Sultans of String
 Vandana Vishwas

Folk
 Ash & Bloom
 Bruce Cockburn
 City & Colour
 Crash Vegas
 Freeman Dre and the Kitchen Party
 Kathleen Edwards
 Justin Hines
 Stephen Fearing
 Great Lake Swimmers
 Emm Gryner
 Sarah Harmer
 Gordon Lightfoot
 Dayna Manning
 Loreena McKennitt
 Moxy Früvous
 Sierra Noble – born in Ottawa, Ontario
 Ian North
 Red Dirt Skinners
 Wade Hemsworth
 Karen James

Goth
 National Velvet
 Rhea's Obsession
 The Birthday Massacre

Hip hop
 Choclair
 Dead Celebrity Status
 Drake
 Dream Warriors
 Eternia
 Houdini
 Jazz Cartier
 K'naan
 k-os
 Kardinal Offishall
 Kid Twist
 Maestro
 Michie Mee
 Nav
 Night Lovell
 Pressa
 Saukrates
 Smoke Dawg

Indie
 Broken Social Scene
 By Divine Right
 The Constantines
 Dala
 Dizzy
 Fifth Column
 Furnaceface
 Hayden
 The Hidden Cameras
 Junior Boys
 King Cobb Steelie
 Lights
 Little Junior
 Marlon Chaplin
 Metric
 Old World Vulture
 Republic of Safety
 Rheostatics
 Skydiggers
 Sheep Look Up
 Sweet Thing
Tokyo Police Club – Newmarket

Industrial
 Ad·ver·sary
 Ayria
 Dandi Wind
 Decoded Feedback
 Digital Poodle
 Epsilon Minus
 Monster Voodoo Machine
 Prospero
 Vampire Rodents
 Zombie Girl

Jazz
 John Alcorn
 Jane Bunnett
 Holly Cole
 Molly Johnson
 Richard Underhill

Metal
 Lee Aaron
 Abandon All Ships
 Adytum
 Annihilator
 Anvil
 Cancer Bats
 Eidolon
 Exciter
 Helix
 Infernäl Mäjesty
 Killer Dwarfs
 Kittie
 Liferuiner
 Piledriver
 Protest the Hero
 Razor
 Structures
 Thine Eyes Bleed
 Threat Signal
 Woods of Ypres

Popular music
 Alanis Morissette
 Alannah Myles
 Alessia Cara
 Alyssa Reid
 Amanda Marshall
 Annette Ducharme
 Aviva Mongillo
 Avril Lavigne
 B4-4
 Candy Coated Killahz
 Dalbello
 Down With Webster
 Deborah Cox
 Fefe Dobson
 Jane Siberry
 Justin Bieber
 Martha and the Muffins
 Paul Anka
 Scott Helman
 Shawn Mendes

Punk
 The 3tards
 Alexisonfire
 Armed and Hammered
 Bad Waitress
 Billy Talent
 Bunchofuckingoofs
 Counterparts
 Dear Jane, I...
 The Diodes
 The Flatliners
 The Forgotten Rebels
 illScarlett – Mississauga
 Jolly Tambourine Man
 Letterbomb- Chatham-Kent
 Like Pacific
 Moneen
 Seaway
 Simply Saucer
 Sum 41
 Teenage Head
 Treble Charger- Sault Ste. Marie
 The Viletones
 Fucked Up
 PUP (band)

Rock and Alternative
 Arkells
 The Argues
 The Band
 Barenaked Ladies
 Barstool Prophets
 Basement Revolver
 Big House
 Big Sugar
 Billy Talent
 Bleeker
 CANO
 Change of Heart
 Cleopatrick - Cobourg
 Coney Hatch
 Danko Jones
 Deadwood Valley
 Death From Above 1979
 Jason Englishman
 Finger Eleven
 FM
 Frozen Ghost
 Goddo
 Harem Scarem
 Ronnie Hawkins
 The Headstones
 Jeff Healey
 High Holy Days
 Hollerado
 I Mother Earth
 Joydrop
 Junkhouse
 The Killjoys - Hamilton
 The Kings
 Graeme Kirkland
 Daniel Lanois
 Hawksley Workman
 Leslie Spit Treeo
 The Lowest of the Low
 Max Webster
 Metric
 Kim Mitchell
 My Darkest Days – Toronto
 National Velvet
 Mary Margaret O'Hara
 The Noolands
 Our Lady Peace
 Parachute Club
 Project Wyze
 The Pursuit of Happiness
 Red Rider
 Redlight King
 Rough Trade
 Rush
 Saga (band)
 Lorraine Segato
 Sarah Slean
 Steppenwolf
 Skye Sweetnam
 Sumo Cyco
 The Black Maria
 The Tea Party
 Teenage Head
 Ian Thornley
 Three Days Grace
 Toronto
 The Tragically Hip
 The Glorious Sons - Kingston 
 13 Engines
 Triumph
 Neil Young

R&B
Toya Alexis
Bass is Base
Jully Black
Divine Brown
Jarvis Church
Jacksoul
Glenn Lewis
Billy Newton-Davis
The Philosopher Kings
Ivana Santilli
The Weeknd
PARTYNEXTDOOR
Roy Woods

See also
 Music of Ontario

Ontario
Musicians